'Delbarestivale', also called 'Delcorf', is a cultivar of domesticated apple, which was developed by the Delbard nursery in France. It is a very sweet apple. 'Delcorf' is a parent of the 'Zari' apple and the 'Nicogreen' apple.

It was awarded the Award of Garden Merit by the Royal Horticultural Society in 1998.

References

Delbard breeds
Apple cultivars
French apples